The Rudolf-Diesel-Medaille is an award by the German Institute for Inventions (D.I.E.) in memory of Rudolf Diesel for inventions and the entrepreneurial and economical implications accounting to the laureate. Since 1953 the award has been presented yearly until 1969 and then irregularly every two or three years.

Laureates 1953 to 1959

1953 
 
 Hermann Röchling
 

1954:
 Ernst Heinkel
 Viktor Kaplan
 Paul Nipkow
 Hermann Oberth
 Wolfgang Putlitz
 
 Joseph Vollmer

1955:
 Herrmann Amme
 Carl Friedrich Benz
 Hans Bredow
 Heinrich Buschmann
 
 Hans Daams
 Wilhelm Geldermann
 
 
 
 
 Max Schimmel
 
 
 Ferdinand Zeppelin
 Berthold Zunckel

1956:
 Friedrich Dessauer
 
 

1959:
 Thorsten Althin
 Franz Maria Feldhaus
 
 F. Lindenmaier
 Alex Lonsinger
 Johann Mangold
 Auguste Piccard
 Karl Röder
 Herbert Storek
 Herbert Venediger

Laureates 1960 to 1969 

1961:
 Claudius Dornier
 Arthur Göhlert
 Alfred Horn
 Georg Hufnagel
 
 
 Carl Rudolf Paul Klingspor
 Hans Ledwinka
 Arthur Mainka
 Hans Rhode
 Karl Heinz Schmidt

1962:
 Hans Baier
 
 Albert Bettag
 Ernst Cvikl
 J. Helmut Danzer
 Frank James Elvy
 John Franklin Enders
 Artur Ermert
 Igo Etrich
 Ernst Fuchs
 Konrad Grebe
 Reinhold Hagmann
 Theodor Hahn
 Walter Hebel
 Erich Hensel
 Maximilian Hornsteiner
 Josef Kainz
 Rudolf Kaiser
 Gustav Kammerer
 Heinz Kemper
 Richard Langer
 C. Walter Leupold
 Wilhelm Loges
 Walter Meining
 Hermann Michael
 Hermann Mücher
 Walter J. Noske
 Walter Philipp
 Robert Rahner
 Ernst Reichelt
 Josef Roiser
 Friedrich Schildberger
 F. W. Schlegel
 Hans Schleicher
 Wilhelm Schmidt
 Hermann Staudinger
 Hugo Tafelmaier

1963:
 Erwin Baas
 Gottlob Bauknecht
 Ludwig Baumann
 Otto Alfred Becker
 Horst-Dieter Bohne
 Heinrich Brandhoff
 
 Erich Döring
 Ernst Giller
 Richard Glimpel
 Wilhelm Hessenstein
 Carl Hermann Heise
  (Ernst von Khuon)
 Max Heinrich Kress
 Heinrich Kukuck
 Egon Larsen
 Otto Lilienthal
 Willi Lippert
 Friedrich Maier
 Christian Meyer
 Willi Müller
 Adolf Nowak
 Erich Olschowski
 Erich Rabe
 Walter Reppe
 Josef Wilhelm Risse
 Hans Rössner
 Paul Schlack
 
 Fritz Tolkien
 Ulrich Tuchel
 Hellmuth Walter
 Peter Weber

1964:
 Heinrich Ballhof
 Otto P. Bühler
 Gustav Erhart
 Rudolf Fitzke
 Paul F. Forbach
 
 Willy O. Herrmann
 Fritz John Jacobsen
 Richard Jahre
 
 Hans-Ulrich Klein
 Alfred Kretzschmar
 Hans Lindemann
 Ernst Linden
 
 Wilhelm Nikolaus Moers
 Josef Nagler
 Herbert Neuhaus
 Horst Pasternack
 
 
 Rolf Sander
 Franz Schmid
 Alois Schmitt
 Eugen Heinrich Fritz Soeding
 Walter Storz
 Fritz Walther
 Willy Wolf
 Frotz Zoder

1965:
 Apollinaris-Brunnen AG
 August Arnold
 Paul Baumann
 Wernher von Braun
 Hermann Buchholz
 José de Soto Burgos
 Curt Eichler
 Wilhelm Ernst
 Alfred Eschebach
 Franz Ferrari
 Albin Johansson
 Kurt Kaschke
 Ottmar Kasparowski
 Fritz Kauer
 Hans Kestler
 Kurt A. Körber
 Paul Krauß
 Friedrich Nallinger (Fritz Nallinger)
 Udo Passavant
 Alfred Pierburg
 Robert Richter
 Georg Rieper
 Rudolf Rzehulka
 Erhard Sattmann
 Erwin Schwarz
 Karl Sprenger
 Wilhelm Stürmer
 Hans Thoma
 Edith Weyde
 Matheus Wiest
 Johannes Wisser
 Anton Wörner
 Hans Ziller
 Hans Zöllner

1966:
 Hans Beck
 Herbert Berg
 Paul Dannemann
 Alfons Drittenthaler
 Karl Eichstädt
 Edgar Frank
 Johann Rudolf Glauber
 Franz R. Habicht
 Karl Harraeus
 Günter Hasenbäumer
 Walter Heimann
 Josef Hoffmann
 Hans Kallas
 Peter Kisteneich
 Josef Kobold
 Fritz Kreis
 Curt Lommel
 Friedrich Martin
 Otto Meyer
 Karl Mienes
 Rolf Moroni
 Siegfried Nitzsche
 Gottfried Severin Paeffgen
 Moritz Pöhlmann
 Erwin Raulf
 Harald Romanus
 Ludwig Schanz

1967:
 Richard Antretter
 Béla Barényi
 Walter Baur
 Hugo Brendel
 Alfred Buch
 Werner Fuhrmann
 Ernst Hatz
 Heinz Jäger
 Karl Jericke
 Willy Kraus
 Erich Kraut
 Ernst Mahle
 Alois Mengele
 Karl F. Nägele
 Robert Plagwitz
 Kurt Schönenberger
 Wilhelm Staffel

1968:
 Georg Bergler
 Karl Breuer
 Franz Josef Fleißner
 Armin Heim
 Rudolf Kellermann
 Lorenz Anton Kersting
 Wilhelm Kölsch
 Karl Krauß
 Hellmut Kreß
 Alfred Krohe
 Harald Loebermann
 Herbert Matis
 Herbert Müller-Neuhaus
 Stanford R. Ovshinsky
 Carl Pieper
 Wunibald Puchner
 Eduard Reimer
 Karlheinz Roth
 Ernst Ruska
 Helmut Sallinger
 René Schubert

1969:
 Ludwig Bölkow
 Kurt Friedrich
 Arnold Giller
 Max Koehler
 Friedrich Krauss
 Karl Kroyer
 Manfred R. Kühnle
 Wolfgang Ritter
 Konrad Zuse

Laureates 1970 to 1979

1972 

Walter Baier, Stockdorf
Herbert Haas, Oberstenfeld
Edmund Munk, Oberstenfeld
Hermann Renner, Magstadt
Karl Heinz Vahlbrauk, Bad Gandersheim

1975 

Fritz Bauer, Altdorf
Kurt Becker, Obernkirchen
Hermann Burkhard, Reutlingen
Friedrich Burmester, Reutlingen
Otto Oeckl, Munich
Gottfried Piekarski, Burghausen
Ewald Pirson, Burghausen
Ulrich Poppe, Falkenstein / Oberpfalz
Georg-Gerd Richter, Darmstadt
Franz Rudolf, Schwäbisch Gmünd

1977 

Josef Berg, Heidelberg
Wolfgang Bogen, Berlin
Hans Eckstaedt, Wuppertal
Kurt Eichweber, Hamburg
Rudolf Gäth, Limburgerhof
Siegfried Lehsten, Eßlingen
Julius Lidenmayer, Augsburg
Walter Mayer, Zirndorf
Klaudius Patzelt, Welzheim
Hilmar Vits, Leichlingen
H. Ch. Roy, Planegg
Kurt Schade, Fürth
K.H. Steigerwald, Puchheim
Max Mengeringhausen, Würzburg

Laureates 1980 to 1989

1980 

Uwe Classen, Zirndorf
Wilhelm Hegler, Bad Kissingen
Manfred Helfrecht, Poppenreuth
Engelbert Krempl, Burgkirchen
Alfred Meier, Nellingen
Heinz Müller, Burgkirchen
Ernst Schulze, Hamburg
Hans Viessman, Battenberg
Manfred Wick, München
Heinrich Welke, Erlangen
Walther Zarges, Murnau am Staffelsee

1982 

Armin Bauder, Neckarsulm
Ernst Christian, Nürnberg
Heinz Hölter, Gladbeck
Alexander Kückens, Reinfeld (Holstein)
Xaver Lipp, Ellwangen
Josef W. Manger, Arnstein
Hannes Marker, Garmisch-Partenkirchen
Julius Maus von Resch, Stuttgart
Hans Sauer, Deisenhofen
Wolfgang Seikritt, Usingen
Erwin Sick, Waldkirch
Rolf Susemihl, Bad Homburg
Friedrich Stastny, Ludwigshafen
Johannes Steinwart, Obersulm
Herbert Zimmermann, Hagen
Rudolf Zinsser, Kelheim

1984 

Alfred Börner, Niederkail/Eifel
Volker Dolch, Dietzenbach
Ludwig Elsbett, Hilpoltstein
Kurt Fickelscher, Frankenthal
Gerhard W Goetze, Wuppertal
Berthold Leibinger, Gerlingen
Adolf Michel, Seeshaupt
Peter Pfleiderer, München
Heinz Süllhöfer, Düsseldorf
Maximilian Wächtler, Hamburg

1986 

Reinhold Ficht, Kirchseeon
Otto Breckner, Offenburg
Bernhard Dietrich, Eichenau
Artur Fischer, Waldachtal
Hasso Freundner, Halver
Otto Grimm, Hamburg
Manfred Held, Schrobenhausen
Ernst Nönnicke, Hamburg
Rolf Schnause, Eckental
Ernst Schuhbauer, München
Hans Spies, Schrobenhausen
Richard Vetter, Peine
Felix Walker, Lindau
Robert Wolff, Engeln

1988 

Manfred von Ardenne, Dresden
Otto Blunck, Lübeck-Travemünde
Albert Blum, Lohmar
Wilfried Goda, Rissen, Hamburg
Bruno Gruber, Olching
Walter Holzen, Meersburg
Gerd Küppe, Bad Salzuflen
Erhard Mayer, Lenggries
Mircon Padovicz, Berlin
Peter Riedhammer, Nürnberg
Wolfgang Zimmermann, Kelkheim

Laureates 1990 to 1999

1990 

Angel Balevsky, Sofia
Uwe Ballies, Kiel
Alfons Ernst, Traunreut
Erich Häußer, Starnberg
Norbert Heske, Türkenfeld
Helmut Hoegl, Pullach
Hermann Kronseder, Niedertraubling
Hilmar Leuthäuser, Wiesenfeld/Coburg
Albert Linz, Rösrath
Hans Joachim von Ohain, Dayton, Ohio
Hans Peter Schabert, Erlangen
Herbert Schneekluth, Aachen
Heinrich Waas, Bonn
Walter Weishaupt, München
Joachim Wendt, Buxtehude
Helmut Würfel, Völklingen

1993 

Alex Faller, Ergoldsbach
Hermann Fischer, Augsburg
Erhard Glatzel, Heidenheim
Janos Ladik, Erlangen
Georg Spinner, Feldkirchen-Westerham
Kurt Stoll, Esslingen am Neckar
Walter Föckersperger, Wurmsham

1997 

Jürgen Dethloff, Hamburg-Othmaschen
Joseph Eichmeier, Neufahrn
Manfred Eigen, Göttingen
, Berlin
Wilhelm Häberle, Scheer
Karsten Henco, Hilden
Xaver Hersacher, Westhausen
Waldemar Helmut Kuherr, Düsseldorf
Heinz Lindenmeier, Planegg
Qingshan Liu, München
Yongxiang Lu, Peking/China
D.W. Lübbers, Dortmund
 , Moscow/Russia
Rudolf Rigler, Stockholm
Karl-Ulrich Rudolph, Witten
Hanns Rump, Dortmund
K.A. Schmidt, Karlsruhe
Siegfried Schulte, Lüdenscheid
Rudolf Zobrow, Düsseldorf

Laureates 2000 to 2009

2001 
Victor Dulger, Heidelberg
Olaf Kiesewetter, Geschwenda
Hans-Guido Klinkner, St. Ingbert
Hans-Diedrich Kreft, Dassendorf
Julius Meimberg, Münster

2004 
Walter Sennheiser, Wendemark
Jörgen Rasmussen, Skafte
Reinhold Würth, Künzelsau
Anton Kathrein, Rosenheim
Sybill Storz, Tuttlingen
Günter Kampichler, Ruhstorf a.d. Rott

2006 
Theodor W. Hänsch, München
Bernd Gombert, Grafrath
Harald Marquardt, Rietheim-Weilheim
Walter Reis, Obernburg

2008 
 Gerhard Ertl, Berlin
 Andreas Grünberg, Jülich
 Dietmar Hopp, Walldorf
 Hasso Plattner, Walldorf
 Klaus Tschira, Heidelberg
 Aloys Wobben, Aurich
 Gerhard Sturm, Mulfingen
 Hans Härle, Bopfingen
 Heinz Leiber, Oberriexingen

Laureates since 2010

2010 
 Friedhelm Loh, Rittal, Herborn
 Wulf Bentlage, Geohumus International, Frankfurt am Main
 Zeitschrift "Innovationsmanager", F.A.Z.-Institut, Frankfurt am Main
 Europäische Patentakademie, Munich

2012 
 Hans Peter Stihl
 Jochen Opländer (WILO SE)
 Erfinderzentrum Norddeutschland (EZN)
 Deutschlandradio – DRadio Wissen

2013 
 Christof Bosch (Bosch-Gruppe)
 Jörg Mittelsten Scheid (Vorwerk)
 Stiftung Jugend forscht
 Wissen vor acht (ARD)

External links 
 Official Website

Invention awards
Awards established in 1953
German awards